Josser Joins the Navy is a 1932 British comedy film directed by Norman Lee and starring Ernie Lotinga, Cyril McLaglen and Jack Hobbs. It was made at Elstree Studios by British International Pictures. It was part of a series of films featuring Lotinga in his Josser character.

Cast
 Ernie Lotinga as Jimmy Josser  
 Cyril McLaglen as Langford 
 Jack Hobbs as Lt. Cmdr. Cole  
 Lesley Wareing as Lesley Beauchamp  
 Renee Gadd as Polly  
 Jack Frost as Spud  
 Harold Saxon-Snell as Ling Foo  
 Charles Paton as Prof. Black  
 Florence Vie as Mrs. Black  
 Leslie Stiles as Admiral

References

Bibliography
 Low, Rachael. Filmmaking in 1930s Britain. George Allen & Unwin, 1985.
 Wood, Linda. British Films, 1927-1939. British Film Institute, 1986.

External links

1932 films
British comedy films
1932 comedy films
Films shot at British International Pictures Studios
Films directed by Norman Lee
Seafaring films
British black-and-white films
1930s English-language films
1930s British films